99.9F° (Ninety-Nine Point Nine Fahrenheit Degrees) is the fourth album by American singer and songwriter Suzanne Vega. Released in 1992, the album marked a departure for Vega, as she embraced a more electronic, experimental sound. It peaked at No. 86 on Billboard magazine's album chart and was Vega's fourth Top 20 album in the U.K. The single "Blood Makes Noise" reached No.1 on the Billboard Modern Rock chart.

The album was certified gold (500,000 copies sold) by the RIAA in October 1997. It  was certified silver in the UK (60,000 copies sold) by the BPI in March 1993.

99.9F° was the first of two of Vega's albums to be produced by Mitchell Froom, whom she later married.

Critical reception
The New York Times wrote: "By far Vega's most rewarding record, 99.9 F degrees ... is the first album in which she breaks almost completely away from the conventions of the New York folk milieu that nurtured her." Trouser Press wrote that "many of the songs display a new interest in space and sound, using both in an almost sculptural fashion, creating a compelling amalgam that industrializes folk music."

Track listing

Personnel
 Suzanne Vega – vocals, acoustic guitar
 Mitchell Froom –keyboards, string arrangement on 12
 Tchad Blake – electric guitar on 3, 4, 6, 10
 David Hidalgo – electric guitar on 1, 2, 3, 4, 7, 8, 11
 Bruce Thomas – bass guitar
 Jerry Marotta – drums, percussion

Additional personnel
 Richard Pleasance – electric guitar on 1, 3, 10
 Michael Visceglia – fretless bass guitar on 5
 Richard Thompson – guitar solo on 11
 Greg Smith – baritone saxophone on 8, 11
 Jerry Scheff – double bass on 6, 12
 Marc Shulman – bouzouki on 5
 Sid Page – 1st violin on 12
 Joel Derouin – 2nd violin on 12
 Maria Newman – viola on 12
 Larry Corbett – cello on 12
 Suzie Katayama – copyist on 12

Technical
 Ronald K. Fierstein – executive producer
 Tchad Blake – engineer, mixing
 Len Peltier, Suzanne Vega – art direction

Charts

Singles

Certifications and sales

References

1992 albums
Albums produced by Mitchell Froom
A&M Records albums
Suzanne Vega albums